There are some 12 major newspapers published in North Korea and many other smaller ones. The most important newspapers are Rodong Sinmun, the organ of the Workers' Party of Korea, and Joson Inmingun, the newspaper of the Korean People's Army, followed by Chongnyon Jonwi, the Kimilsungist-Kimjongilist Youth League paper.

List

General
(체육신문)
Choldo Sinmun(철도신문)
Chongnyon Jonwi, organ of the Central Committee of the Socialist Patriotic Youth League
Joson Inmingun, official newspaper of the Korean People's Army
Korean News Service (Chosun Tongsin,조선통신)
Minju Choson, official newspaper of the Cabinet of North Korea and the Standing Committee of the Supreme People's Assembly
(농업근로자)
Rodong Chongnyon(로동청년)
Rodong Sinmun, the official organ of the Central Committee of the Workers' Party of Korea. Considered a source of official North Korean viewpoints on many issues. In Korean and English.
Rodongja Sinmun, organ of the Central Committee of the General Federation of Trade Unions of Korea
(새날신문)

City-provincial dailies
Kaesong Sinmun
Kangwon Ilbo
Hambuk Ilbo
Hamnam Ilbo
Hwangbuk Ilbo
Chaggang Ilbo
Pyongbuk Ilbo
Pyongnam Ilbo
Pyongyang Sinmun, Workers' Party of Korea Pyongyang Municipal Committee 
The Pyongyang Times
Ryanggang Ilbo
Hwangnam Ilbo

Published abroad
Choson Sinbo, official newspaper of the Chongryon
Minjok Sibo
Rimjingang (unofficial, private publication)

See also

 List of magazines in North Korea
 Lists of newspapers in Korea
 Media of North Korea

References

North Korea
 
Newspapers
Newspapers